Bodo Lukowski (born 2 June 1961) is a German wrestler. He competed at the 1984 Summer Olympics and the 1988 Summer Olympics.

References

1961 births
Living people
German male sport wrestlers
Olympic wrestlers of West Germany
Wrestlers at the 1984 Summer Olympics
Wrestlers at the 1988 Summer Olympics
Sportspeople from Bochum